Gladys Patricia Abdel Rahim Garzón is a Colombian physicist. She is Researcher-Associate Professor of the Francisco José de Caldas District University. Her research is in materials physics.

Education 
She studied physics at the Universidad Distrital Fracisco José de Caldas, specializing in diffraction in crystals. She completed a master's degree in Physics in 2006 and a PhD in engineering in 2017 at the National University of Colombia and graduated with meritorious mention (Doctoral Thesis in engineering).

Career and research 
Her research is into new materials and the structural and electronic properties of materials, as well as surface physics of semiconductors. She has also developed ICT methods of physics teaching.

She has published seven textbooks with the Universidad Distrital Fracisco José de Caldas on topics such as classical mechanics, electromagnetism, vibrations and waves and modern physics from 2005 to 2017, where the modern physics text was recognized as one of the three texts more sold and It was also best sold at the book fair in Santa Marta. She has also published 16 books with the Cámara Colombiana del Libro, based on her teaching physics using information and communication technologies for teaching (TiC) from 2018 to 2020.

Published books 
 Experiencias particulares en clases de física, Cámara Colombina del Libro (2018). 
 Vibraciones Y Ondas Desde El Aprendizaje Virtual, Cámara Colombina del Libro (2018). 
 Laboratorios virtuales resueltos de física moderna: versión para el profesor, Cámara Colombina del Libro (2018), 
 Propuesta del uso de los libros “De la ciencia para todos” para la enseñanza de la física a nivel superior, Cámara Colombina del Libro (2018),  
 Propuesta de laboratorios virtuales para biofísica: TiC, Cámara Colombina del Libro (2018), 
 Laboratorio Virtual De Mecánica De Fluidos, Cámara Colombina del Libro (2018), 
 La Enseñanza De La Termodinámica A Partir De Las TiC, Cámara Colombina del Libro (2018), 
 Proyecto de Proyecto de aula: aplicar las cuatro ecuaciones de Maxwell, Cámara Colombina del Libro (2018), 
 Proyectos de aula generar un prototipo para aplicar Las cuatro ecuaciones de Maxwell, Cámara Colombina del Libro (2018), 
 Uso de los laboratorios virtuales como actividad complementaria para la enseñanza del electromagnetismo, Cámara Colombina del Libro (2018),  
 El año de la luz: una oportunidad para hablar sobre la enseñanza de la física, Cámara Colombina del Libro (2018), 
 Laboratorios de Física moderna, Cámara Colombina del Libro (2018), 
 Experiencias virtuales: física mecánica, Cámara Colombina del Libro (2018),

Selected publications 
The publications by Abdel Rahim Garzón on condensed-matter physicist using theoretical and computational tools to study the properties of materials from first-principles. Where is included the study of the physical and chemical properties of insulators, magnetics semiconductors, semiconductor surfaces, two-dimensional systems and metals alloys, some publications are:

 Gladys Patricia Abdel Rahim, Jairo Arbey Rodriguez. Structural and electronic properties of ScC and NbC: A first principles study. (2013) Solid State Phenomena 194, 276–279.
 Gladys Patricia Abdel Rahim, Jairo Arbey Rodriguez, MG Moreno-Armenta. First principles study of structural, electronic and magnetic properties of magnesium. (2016)  Journal of Physics: Conference Series   Volume 687, Issue 1, article id. 012043
 Gladys Patricia Abdel Rahim, Jairo Arbey Rodriguez, MG Moreno-Armenta.First-Principles Investigation of the Structural and Electronic Properties of Mg1-xBixO. (2015) World Academy of Science, Engineering and Technology, 2574
 Gladys Patricia Abdel Rahim, Jairo Arbey Rodríguez. Study ab-initio of the stability of the structural and electronic properties of Bi1-xMg xO. (2014). Iteckne 1 (11), 84-92
 Gladys Patricia Abdel Rahim, Jairo Arbey Rodriguez, MG Moreno-Armenta, Miguel Espitia Rico.First-principles calculations of structural and electronics properties of YInN alloy. (2021) Revista DYNA, 88(217),50-57
 Gladys Patricia Abdel Rahim, Manuel Antonio Moreno Villate. Cálculo de las ecuaciones del movimiento parabólico usando Tracker(2022) Revista Educación En Ingeniería, 17(33), 45-51
 Gladys Patricia Abdel Rahim, Manuel Antonio Moreno Villate. Determinación del coeficiente de fricción dinámico con Tracker(2022) Latin-American Journal of Physics Education, 16(33), 1303-1-1303-9
 Gladys Patricia Abdel Rahim, Manuel Antonio Moreno Villate. Uso de Tracker como herramienta de análisis en experimentos caseros para el aprendizaje de la física mecánica(2022) Revista Educación En Ingeniería, 17(34), 1-17

References 

Colombian women physicists
Living people
Year of birth missing (living people)